DSB International School, also known as Deutsche Schule Bombay, is an international school located in the city of Mumbai, India. It provides the National Curriculum of England and the German Curriculum of Thuringia and was established in 1961.

Curriculum
DSB International School follows the English National Curriculum for students aged 3 – 18 years.  The Cambridge IGCSE is offered to students between the ages of 14 to 16 and the IB Diploma Programme caters to pre-university students between the age of 16 to 19. The school is partly German and offers German and French as a first language.

The German section follows the curriculum for German Schools Abroad (Thüringen) up to the age of 14 years. After this point, students join the International Section to take IGCSE and IBDP, both of which are fully recognized in Germany.

Campuses
DSB International School has two campuses. In 1967, the school moved into Garden Campus in Breach Candy, which is the current Lower Primary Campus (Kindergarten through Year 4/Grade/Klasse 5). In 2014, the Secondary School moved into the Aurum House in Babulnath (from Year 5/Grade/Klasse 6).

History
Due to growing diplomatic relations between India and Germany, and partly due to the influx of German companies in India, many German citizens were attracted to India, especially to the city of Mumbai. With the focus of educating German expatriates in India with a German method of teaching, the Deutsche Schulverien was built. Despite being built to cater exclusively to the German diaspora, children from countries such as Chile and Japan were admitted.

In 1967, the school moved to the Garden Campus. At the beginning of the 2000s, fewer Germans were coming to India, and the school started an international section with the British, Cambridge IGCSE and IB Curricula. In 2014, the new Aurum House, or AU, was built for the secondary grades. AU's internal spaces were designed to facilitate modern learning styles to better equip students.

Student life
The school offers after-school activities including creative, cultural, sporting, adventure and service activities. Students have the opportunity to become active in Model United Nations and the Duke of Edinburgh Award. Students participate at external MUN conferences at a national and international level. Several Mumbai-based international schools hold MUN conferences which DSB participates in. Further, DSB sends delegates to COBIS MUN and the Harvard Model Congress Europe (HMCE).

Many of the students are expatriates from over 20 countries while others are of Indian ancestry.

References

External links

 DSB International School

German international schools in India
International schools in Mumbai
Educational institutions established in 1961
1961 establishments in Maharashtra